Charles Knox (10 January 1770 – 30 January 1825)  was Archdeacon of Armagh from 1814 until his death.

The 6th son of the 1st Viscount Northland,  he was born in Dublin and educated at Trinity College there. He was Member of Parliament for Dungannon from 1798 to 1799. He was ordained in 1799 and held livings at Dunkerron, Drumachose and Urney. He was a Prebendary of Derry from 1807  and St Patrick's Cathedral, Dublin from 1817.  He was the father of Primate Knox and brother of Bishops William and Edmund Knox.

Notes

Alumni of Trinity College Dublin
19th-century Irish Anglican priests
Archdeacons of Armagh
Members of the Parliament of Ireland (pre-1801) for County Tyrone constituencies
Younger sons of viscounts
1770 births
1825 deaths